Bocani is a village in Fălești District, Moldova.

References

Villages of Fălești District